Kevin Dewayne Williams, Sr. (born April 22, 1973) is a former professional American football player who played linebacker in the Canadian Football League, the National Football League, and  NFL Europe.
Williams is the birth father of ice hockey player Keegan Kolesar.

References

External links
Just Sports Stats
NFL Europe stats

1973 births
Living people
Players of American football from Tampa, Florida
Players of Canadian football from Tampa, Florida
American football linebackers
Canadian football linebackers
African-American players of American football
African-American players of Canadian football
Thomas Jefferson High School (Tampa, Florida) alumni
Henderson State Reddies football players
Winnipeg Blue Bombers players
Saskatchewan Roughriders players
Hamilton Tiger-Cats players
Frankfurt Galaxy players
Oakland Raiders players
Green Bay Packers players
21st-century African-American sportspeople
20th-century African-American sportspeople